Morgyn Neill (born 10 March 1996) is a Scottish professional footballer who plays a defender for Cove Rangers. He has previously played for Motherwell, Livingston, Stranraer, Stenhousemuir and Dumbarton, as well as Ayr United and Stranraer on loan.

Early life
Neill was born on 10 March 1996, in Glasgow. He joined the Motherwell youth academy at a young age.

Career

Motherwell
Neill was at Motherwell for 10 years, but couldn't force his way into the first team. He played with the development squad, and played as a defender.

Having been named on the substitutes bench for Motherwell on a number of occasions during the 2014–15 season, Neill signed for Ayr United on loan on 9 January 2015, with Motherwell manager Ian Baraclough saying he needed to play first-team football. He made his debut for Ayr on 10 January 2015, in a 2–1 defeat away at Brechin City. He scored his first goal for the club one week later in a 1–1 draw with Greenock Morton.

Livingston
After a successful trial, playing in friendly matches against Dunfermline Athletic and Real Sociedad, Livingston boss Mark Burchill handed Neill a two-year deal. He made his full debut for Livingston against Hibernian in a 1–0 loss.

Stranraer
In an effort to continue his development, Livingston allowed Neill on to move on loan to fellow Scottish League One side Stranraer for the remainder of the 2016–17 season. After returning from his loan spell Neill was released by Livingston in May 2017, subsequently signing a permanent contract with Stranraer where he went on to be a key player making 59 appearances in a season and a half.

Stenhousemuir 
Neill left Stranraer in the summer of 2018, joining Scottish League One rivals Stenhousemuir in May 2018.

Dumbarton 
Neill joined Dumbarton following Stenhousemuir's relegation in May 2019 playing every minute of the season as the Sons finished sixth in Scottish League One. He extended his deal with the Sons until the summer of 2021 in July 2020. Neill left the Sons in May 2021, turning down a new deal after the departure of manager Jim Duffy.

Cove Rangers
Neill signed for Cove Rangers on June 4, 2021 after his release from Dumbarton and scored his first goal for the club in a 1-0 win over Airdrieonians.

Career statistics

References

External links

Scottish footballers
Living people
1996 births
Motherwell F.C. players
Ayr United F.C. players
Livingston F.C. players
Stranraer F.C. players
Footballers from Glasgow
Scottish Professional Football League players
Stenhousemuir F.C. players
Dumbarton F.C. players
Association football defenders
Cove Rangers F.C. players